Bradley Keith Salmon (born January 3, 1980) is an American former professional baseball pitcher.

Career
On March 19, the Cincinnati Reds traded Salmon to the Kansas City Royals for a player to be named later (Henry Arias).

He became a free agent at the end of the 2008 season and signed a minor league contract with the Chicago White Sox. He was released by the White Sox during spring training. On April 22, 2009, Salmon signed a minor league deal with the Los Angeles Angels of Anaheim. He spent the season with the Salt Lake Bees, the Angels' Triple-A affiliate.

References

External links

1980 births
Living people
Acereros de Monclova players
American expatriate baseball players in Mexico
Baseball players from Florida
Billings Mustangs players
Cincinnati Reds players
Chattanooga Lookouts players
Clinton LumberKings players
Dayton Dragons players
Jefferson Davis Warhawks baseball players
Louisville Bats players
Major League Baseball pitchers
Mexican League baseball pitchers
Mudville Nine players
Omaha Royals players
Potomac Cannons players
Salt Lake Bees players